Kathleen Halloran Chapman, (born January 19, 1937), known as Kay Chapman or Kay Halloran, is an American politician and attorney who served as Mayor of Cedar Rapids, Iowa from 2006 to 2009.

Early life and education 
Halloran was born on January 19, 1937, in Estherville, Iowa. She graduated from Franklin High School in Cedar Rapids before earning a Bachelor of Arts degree in Political Science from the State University of Iowa. She later returned to her alma mater to earn a Juris Doctor.

Career 
A Democrat, she previously served as a member of the Iowa House of Representatives, and a member of the Mayors Against Illegal Guns Coalition, an organization formed in 2006 and co-chaired by New York City mayor Michael Bloomberg and Boston mayor Thomas Menino.
 
Halloran was the first woman to enter into private law practice in Cedar Rapids, and the city's second female mayor. Halloran opted not to run for re-election after being diagnosed with breast cancer.

References

1937 births
Living people
People from Estherville, Iowa
University of Iowa alumni
Mayors of Cedar Rapids, Iowa
Democratic Party members of the Iowa House of Representatives
Women mayors of places in Iowa
Women state legislators in Iowa
Iowa lawyers
21st-century American women